Orlovo is a rural locality (a selo) in Orlovskoye Rural Settlement, Velikoustyugsky District, Vologda Oblast, Russia. The population was 11 as of 2002.

Geography 
Orlovo is located 65 km southeast of Veliky Ustyug (the district's administrative centre) by road. Chernevo is the nearest rural locality.

References 

Rural localities in Velikoustyugsky District